El Menabha (also written El Mena Bha or Menabha) is a village in the commune of Mogheul, in Lahmar District, Béchar Province, Algeria. The village lies north of Lahmar on the road to Mogheul town.

References 

Neighbouring towns and cities

Populated places in Béchar Province